The Minister of Foreign Affairs of Georgia is the head of the Ministry of Foreign Affairs of Georgia, the governmental body of Georgia responsible for protecting and promoting Georgia’s interest and its persons and entities abroad. The minister is a member of the Cabinet of Georgia.

The current minister is Ilia Darchiashvili, who was appointed on April 4, 2022 by Prime Minister Irakli Garibashvili.

List of Ministers

Ministers of Foreign Affairs of Democratic Republic of Georgia

People's Commissars of Foreign Affairs of Georgian SSR

Ministers of Foreign Affairs of Georgian SSR

Ministers of Foreign Affairs of Georgia

References 

Foreign Ministers of Georgia
Georgia
.F